Heterothyonidae is a family of sea cucumbers belonging to the order Dendrochirotida.

The following genera are recognised in the family Heterothyonidae:
 Heterothyone Panning, 1949
 †Strobilothyone Smith & Gallemí, 1991

References

Dendrochirotida
Echinoderm families